Krasilnikova (Russian: Красильникова) is a Russian surname. Notable people with the surname include:

 Ksenia Krasilnikova (born 1991), Russian pair skater
 Olga Krasilnikova, wartime crossdresser

See also
 Krasilnikov (disambiguation)

Russian-language surnames